This is a list of schools in the Borough of Hartlepool in County Durham, England.

State-funded schools

Primary schools

Barnard Grove Primary School
Brougham Primary School
Clavering Primary School
Eldon Grove Academy
Eskdale Academy
Fens Primary School
Golden Flatts Primary School
Grange Primary School
Greatham CE Primary School
Hart Primary School
Holy Trinity CE Primary School
Jesmond Gardens Primary School
Kingsley Primary School
Lynnfield Primary School
Rift House Primary School
Rossmere Academy
Sacred Heart RC Primary School
St Aidan's CE Memorial Primary School
St Bega's RC Primary School
St Cuthbert's RC Primary School
St Helen's Primary School
St John Vianney RC Primary School
St Joseph's RC Primary School
St Peter's Elwick CE Primary School
St Teresa's RC Primary School
Stranton Primary School
Throston Primary School
Ward Jackson Primary School
West Park Primary School
West View Primary School

Secondary schools
Dyke House Sports and Technology College
English Martyrs School and Sixth Form College
High Tunstall College of Science
Manor Community Academy
St Hild's Church of England School

Special and alternative schools
Catcote Academy
The Horizon School
Springwell School

Further education
Hartlepool College of Further Education
Hartlepool Sixth Form College

Independent schools

Special and alternative schools
Cambian Hartlepool School
Wrenfield Learning Centre

Hartlepool
Schools in the Borough of Hartlepool
Lists of buildings and structures in County Durham